Ernest Murray Brown (December 7, 1890 – March 15, 1961) was a provincial politician from Alberta, Canada. He served as the Didsbury Member of the Legislative Assembly of Alberta from 1940 to 1944, sitting as an Independent in government. He was a member of the anti-Social Credit "Unity League" movement.

He did not run for re-election in 1944.

References

Independent Alberta MLAs
1961 deaths
1890 births
People from the Halifax Regional Municipality
People from Didsbury, Alberta